The 5th Regional Command directly under the Vietnam People's Navy (VPN) is the Naval Operations Command that independently manages and protects the waters of the South of the South China Sea, and Gulf of Thailand in the waters of two provinces, Cà Mau (the southwestern sea of Vietnam Cà Mau) and Kiên Giang.

History 

 On October 26, 1975, 5th Coastal Region (Vùng Duyên hải 5) was established under the Naval Command.
 In 1978, the 5th Coastal Region changed its name to the 5th Naval Region Command (Bộ Chỉ huy Vùng 5 Hải quân) of the Navy.
 On January 14, 2011, the 5th Naval Region Command was upgraded to the 5th Regional Command.

Current leadership 

 Commander: Rear Admiral Nguyễn Duy Tỷ (former Deputy Commander-Chief of Staff of 5th Regional Command)
 Political Commissar: Rear Admiral Nguyễn Đăng Tiến (former Deputy Political Commissar of 5th Regional Command)
 Deputy Commander-Chief of Staff: Colonel Tạ Quang Nam
 Deputy Commander: Colonel Nguyễn Quốc Doanh (former Brigade Commander of the 147th Naval Infantry Brigade - 1st Regional Command)
 Deputy Commander: Colonel Võ Đức Tiên
 Deputy Political Commissar: Colonel Nguyễn Hữu Thoan

Organisation 

 Advisory Department
 Political Department
 Logistics Department
 Technical Department
 127th Surface Ship Brigade
 556th Engineer Battalion
 563rd Naval Infantry Battalion
 551st Radar Battalion
 565th Infantry Battalion
 553rd Anti-Aircraft Artillery Battalion

Commanders - Commanders of the Region through the ages 

 1975-1977: Colonel Nguyễn Thế Trinh, Commander
 1977-1981: Colonel Nguyễn Dưỡng, Commander
 1981-1984: Colonel Bùi Lê Tuấn, Commander
 1984-1988: Colonel Nguyễn Huy Lý, Commander of the Region
 1988-1991: Colonel Trịnh Khắc Thuyết, Commander of the Region
 1991-2001: Colonel Phạm Xuân Nựu, Commander of the Region
 2001-2002: Colonel Hoàng Thế Sự, Commander of the Region
 2002-2012: Rear Admiral Doãn Văn Sở, Commander of the Region
 2012-2016: Rear Admiral Doãn Văn Sở, Commander of the Region
 2016-2018: Colonel Phạm Mạnh Hùng, Commander of the Region
 2018-present, Rear Admiral Nguyễn Duy Tỷ, Commander of the Region

Political Commissars - Deputy political commanders over the periods 

 1975-1981: Colonel Nguyễn Văn Lắm, Political Commissar
 1981-1985: Colonel Phạm Xuân Trường, deputy political commander
 1985-1987: Colonel Trần Khoái, deputy political commander
 1987-1988: Colonel Phạm Reng, Deputy Chief Political Officer
 1988-1991: Colonel Nguyễn Huy Thăng, Deputy Chief Political Officer
 1991-1997: Colonel Đỗ Xuân Thành, deputy political commander
 1997-2005: Colonel Nguyễn Xuân Hợi, Deputy Chief Political Officer
 2005-2008, Ngô Văn Phát, Rear Admiral (2011), Deputy Political Commander
 2008-2014: Ngô Văn Phát, Rear Admiral (2011), Political Commissar of the Region
 2014-2017: Colonel Đoàn Văn Chiều, Colonel, Political Commissar of the Region
 2017-2019: Rear Admiral Ngô Văn Thuân, Political Commissar of the Region
 2019 - present, Rear Admiral Nguyễn Đăng Tiến, Political Commissar of the Region

See also 

 1st Regional Command
 2nd Regional Command
 3rd Regional Command
 4th Regional Command

References 

Regional Command, Vietnam People's Navy